A regional election took place in Rhône-Alpes on 21 March and 28 March 2004, along with all other regions. Jean-Jack Queyranne (PS) was elected president, defeating the incumbent Anne-Marie Comparini (UDF).

2004 elections in France
2004